Nikola Vojinović is a politician in Serbia. He has served in the National Assembly of Serbia since 2020 as a member of the Serbian Progressive Party.

Early life and career
Vojinović was born in Belgrade, in what was then the Socialist Republic of Serbia in the Socialist Federal Republic of Yugoslavia. He holds a Bachelor of Laws degree and earned a master's degree in management in 2012. He is a teaching associate at the Faculty of Business and Industrial Management in Belgrade and is the owner of the company Podrum Vojinović.

Politician

Municipal politics
Vojinović received the sixth position on the Progressive Party's electoral list for the Zvezdara municipal assembly in the 2016 Serbian local elections and was elected when the list won twenty-two out of fifty-three seats. The Progressives became the dominant force in a local coalition government after the election, the Vojinović served as a government supporter in the assembly. On 18 November 2016, he was appointed as a member of the city council (i.e., the executive branch of the municipal government). He served in this position for the next four years and did not seek re-election to the assembly in 2020.

Parliamentarian
Vojinović was given the 182nd position on the Progressive Party's Aleksandar Vučić — For Our Children list in the 2020 Serbian parliamentary election and was elected when the list won a landslide majority with 188 out of 250 mandates. He is a member of the assembly committee on spatial planning, transport, infrastructure, and telecommunications; a deputy member of the committee on finance, state budget, and control of public spending; a deputy member of the committee on administrative, budgetary, mandate, and immunity issues; the head of Serbia's parliamentary friendship group with El Salvador; and a member of the parliamentary friendship groups with Denmark, France, Italy, Spain, and the United States of America.

References

1985 births
Living people
Politicians from Belgrade
Members of the National Assembly (Serbia)
Serbian Progressive Party politicians